Riaz Gujjar (Punjabi) is 1991 Pakistani, action and a musical film directed by Hassan Askari and produced by Muhammad Younis. The Film starring actor Sultan Rahi, Anjuman, Hina Shaheen, and Afzaal Ahmed, Edited by Mohammad Ashiq Ali.

Story 
Lahore murder of Mumtaz Malik is a film role name Zafri and four others at Lakshmi Chowk was the result of another old enmity that has claimed many lives in Lahore's criminal underground over the years. Here are four of the most violent gangland rivalries, some of them still unfinished.

Cast 
 Sultan Rahi as (Riaz Gujjar)
 Anjuman
 Hina Shaheen
 Mumtaz Malik
 Humayun Qureshi
 Tariq Shah
 Afzaal Ahmad
 Bahar
 Ladla
 Raseela
 Altaf Khan
 Anwar Khan

Soundtrack
The music of Riaz Gujjar is composed by Wajahat Attray with lyrics penned by Khawaja Pervez. The album earned

Track listing

References

External links 
 
 Riaz Gujjar Pakistani Punjabi language
 
 Riaz Gujjar (1991) Pakistani Punjabi Information

1990s crime films
Pakistani action films
Pakistani fantasy films
1991 films
Nigar Award winners
1991 fantasy films
Fantasy action films
1990s crime action films
Punjabi-language Pakistani films
1990s Punjabi-language films